7-cyano-7-deazaguanine synthase (preQ0 synthase, 7-cyano-7-carbaguanine synthase, queC (gene)) is an enzyme with systematic name 7-carboxy-7-carbaguanine:ammonia ligase (ADP-forming). This enzyme catalyses the following chemical reaction

 7-carboxy-7-carbaguanine + NH3 + ATP  7-cyano-7-carbaguanine + ADP + phosphate + H2O

This enzyme binds Zn2+.

References

External links 
 

EC 6.3.4